Ik (Iq) is a rural locality (a village) in Tarkazinsky Selsoviet, Yermekeyevsky District, Bashkortostan, Russia. The population was 31 as of 2010. There is 1 street.

Geography 
Ik is located 52 km south of Yermekeyevo (the district's administrative centre) by road. Islambakhty is the nearest rural locality.

References 

Rural localities in Yermekeyevsky District